Kenny Godoy is a Honduran judoka who competes in the men's 60 kg category. At the 2012 Summer Olympics, he was defeated in the first round.

References

Honduran male judoka

Living people
Olympic judoka of Honduras
Judoka at the 2012 Summer Olympics
Year of birth missing (living people)